Cathorops wayuu, the Wayuu sea catfish, is a species of sea catfish. It is found in shallow coastal and estuarine waters from Camarones in Colombia to the Gulf of Paria in Venezuela. Maximum recorded body length is 31.4 cm.

References

Ariidae
Fish described in 2012